Brainpipe: A Plunge to Unhumanity is an action video game developed by Digital Eel for Microsoft Windows, Mac OS and handhelds and was released on December 24, 2008. The game received "Excellence in Audio" award at Independent Games Festival 2009.

References 

2008 video games
Action video games
Indie video games
MacOS games
PlayStation Network games
Independent Games Festival winners
Video games developed in the United States
Windows games
Shrapnel Games games